Dimitrios Kapos (born 28 August 1993) is a Greek professional footballer who plays as a centre forward for Football League club Egaleo.

Career
Kapos started playing in his local Chios-based amateur club Kanaris Neniton in 2012. In the season 2013-14, Kapos made a major step in his career and moved to Greek Super League club Levadiakos, although he didn't manage to play in an official league game. The next season (2014-2015) he signed with Gamma Ethniki team Opountios Martino where he had a full and productive participation with 7 goals in 26 appearances.  On 15 of July 2015, he moved to AEL and signed a 3-years contract. On 29 July 2017 he extended his contract until the summer of 2020 before joining Trikala on a season-long loan. On 16 December 2017 he scored his first goal in a 1-0 away win against Karaiskakis.

References

External links
 onsports.gr (Greek)
 myplayer.gr (Greek)
 imathiasportsnews.gr(Greek)
 tvpatrida.gr

1993 births
Living people
Athlitiki Enosi Larissa F.C. players
Sportspeople from Chios
Greek footballers
Trikala F.C. players
Association football forwards